Leionema ceratogynum is a dense shrub, it grows on the south coast of New South Wales, Australia. It has oval-elliptic shaped leaves, scented foliage and lemon flowers usually in groups of three arising from the leaf axils.

Description
The leaf surface may be smooth or have short, firm hairs, raised warty oil-glands or occasional star-shaped hairs. The inflorescence consists of a tight grouping of usually three pale yellow flowers on a more or less smooth peduncle.

Taxonomy and naming
Leionema ceratogynum was first formally described in 2004 by Neville Grant Walsh and the description was published in Telopea. The specific epithet (ceratogynum) is from the Greek,  ceras meaning "horn" and gyne meaning female, alluding to the distinct beaked carpels.

Distribution and habitat
This species has a restricted distribution, only found in the Wadbilliga National Park on the south coast of New South Wales.  Found growing on ridges at higher altitudes in mostly dry scrubland, heath and mallee.

References 

ceratogynum
Sapindales of Australia
Flora of New South Wales
Taxa named by Neville Grant Walsh